James Levi Barton (1855–1936) was an American Protestant missionary and educator who devoted his life to establishing and administering schools and colleges in the Near East, and overseeing Near East relief efforts before and after World War I. He rose to prominence in the United States and internationally when he was named Chairman of the American Committee for Relief in the Near East, and subsequently the follow-on organization, Near East Relief. He was fluent in Armenian, a prolific writer with numerous books to his name, and the recipient of multiple honorary degrees.

Biography 
James L. Barton was born to a Quaker family in Charlotte, Vermont on September 23, 1855.

He graduated from Middlebury College in 1881, and from Hartford Theological Seminary in 1885.

He died at New England Deaconess Hospital in Boston on July 21, 1936, and was buried at Newton Cemetery in Newton, Massachusetts.

Honorary doctorates 
Barton was honored with five honorary doctorates from four universities:
Middlebury College
Oberlin College
Dartmouth College
Grinnell College

Associated organizations 
Foreign Secretary of American Board of Commissioners for Foreign Missions
Chairperson, American Committee for Relief in the Near East
Chairperson, Near East Relief

Books 
The Missionary and His Critics, 1906
Daybreak in Turkey, 1908
The Unfinished Task of the Christian Church: Introductory Studies in the Problem of the World’s Evangelization, 1908
Human Progress through Missions, 1912
Educational Missions], 1913[https://archive.org/details/christianapproac00bartrich The Christian Approach to Islam, 1918
The Story of Near East Relief (1915–1930), 1930

Articles and journals

References 

1855 births
1936 deaths
Middlebury College alumni
American Protestant missionaries
20th-century American non-fiction writers